Mircea R. Stan is a Romanian-American computer scientist, researcher and professor of electrical and computer engineering at the University of Virginia (UVA). He leads the High-Performance Low-Power (HPLP) lab at UVA and is an associate director of the Center for Automata Processing at UVA. He holds the Virginia Microelectronics Consortium (VMEC) chaired professor position at UVa. Stan's research is focused in the areas of high-performance low-power VLSI, temperature-aware circuits and architecture, embedded systems, cyber-physical systems, spintronics, and nanoelectronics.

Education and career
Stan received his diploma in Electronics and Communications from Politehnica University of Bucharest, Romania in 1984. He later received his Master's Degree (1994) and Ph.D. (1996) from the University of Massachusetts - Amherst with Wayne Burleson as his dissertation advisor. In 1996, he joined the Charles L. Brown Department of Electrical and Computer Engineering at the University of Virginia, where he has been teaching and performing research since. During his time at UVA, Stan has become the Virginia Microelectronics Consortium (VMEC) Professor (2019), an associate director at the Center for Automata Processing (CAP), and the leader of the High-Performance Low-Power(HPLP) lab. In addition to his time at UVA, Stan has also worked at the University of California, Berkeley as a visiting faculty member (2004-2005). He was also a visiting faculty member at Intel (1999 and 2002) as well as IBM (2000).

Research and publications
Stan's research is focused on the areas of high-performance low-power VLSI, temperature-aware circuits and architecture, embedded systems, cyber-physical systems, spintronics, and nanoelectronics. His research interests include Internet of Things, low power design, processing in memory, and AI hardware. Stan has a number of publications, including the Bus Invert low-power encoding method and the HotSpot thermal modeling framework. His work with the HPLP lab at UVA includes research on hardware accelerators, processing in memory, cyber-physical systems, and emerging technologies.

References

External links 

Living people
Politehnica University of Bucharest alumni
Romanian computer scientists
University of Virginia faculty
Romanian emigrants to the United States
Year of birth missing (living people)